Richard Elsdon Johnston (2 January 1931 – 18 July 2001) was an Olympic track cyclist from Dannevirke, New Zealand, who participated in the 1956 Summer Olympic games. He competed in the 2 kilometre tandem event with his brother Warren Johnston, and was the flag-bearer for New Zealand.

References

External links
 

1931 births
2001 deaths
Cyclists at the 1956 Summer Olympics
New Zealand male cyclists
Olympic cyclists of New Zealand
Sportspeople from Dannevirke
20th-century New Zealand people